Major General Ernst Ferdinand von der Lancken (24 August 1841 – 18 May 1902) was a Swedish Army officer. His senior commands includes the post as Inspector of the Swedish Army Service Troops (1889–1892) and Acting Chief of the General Staff (1892–1895).

Early life
von der Lancken was born on 24 August 1841 in Malmö, Sweden, the son of lieutenant colonel Gustaf Ferdinand von der Lancken and his wife Katarina Benedikta (née Wulff). He was the brother of Deputy Governor of Stockholm (Underståthållare), Ehrenfried von der Lancken (1843–1919). He passed studentexamen in Lund in 1858 and graduated with an administrative degree (kansliexamen) in 1864.

Career
von der Lancken was commissioned into the South Scanian Infantry Regiment with the rank of underlöjtnant in 1860. He became a General Staff officer in 1866 and was promoted to lieutenant in the South Scanian Infantry Regiment in 1870. von der Lancken became captain in the General Staff in 1873 and in the South Scanian Infantry Regiment in 1878. He served as teacher of general staff service at the Royal Swedish Army Staff College from 1878 to 1884 and as chief of staff of the 4th Military District from 1879 to 1881.

von der Lancken was promoted to major in the Älvsborg Regiment in 1881, and became a lieutenant colonel there in 1884 and in the General Staff the same year. He then served as head of the Statistical Department of the General Staff from 1884 to 1892 and as Inspector of the Swedish Army Service Troops from 1889 to 1892. von der Lancken was promoted to colonel in the Swedish Army in 1891 and in the General Staff in 1892. He then served as Acting Chief of the General Staff from 1892 to 1895. von der Lancken was promoted to major general in the army in 1894. As Acting Chief of the General Staff, von der Lancken drafted the proposal for improved army order, which, with few modifications, was adopted by the 1892 Riksdag and was adopted by the King in Council.

He was also the driving force of the 1881—83 Service Regulations Committee. He wrote a large number of annual reports, biographies, essays and - generally very sharp - criticisms in Krigsvetenskapsakademiens handlingar och tidskrift, and also translated and provided comments to the Russian military author 's work Positive Strategy
(1874).

Personal life
von der Lancken never married. It said "Faithful and noble" in his obituary, signed by the deceased's brother, Ehrenfried von der Lancken.

Death
He died on 18 May 1902 in Hedvig Eleonora Parish in Stockholm. He was buried at Norra begravningsplatsen in Stockholm.

Dates of rank
1858 – Furir
1860 – Underlöjtnant
1866 – Lieutenant
1870 – Second lieutenant
1873 – First lieutenant
1873 – Captain
1881 – Major
1884 – Lieutenant colonel
1890 – Colonel
1896 – Major general

Awards and decorations
   Commander 1st Class of the Order of the Sword
   Knight of the Order of the Polar Star
   Knight of the Order of St. Olav

Honours
Member of the Royal Swedish Academy of War Sciences (1875)

References

External links
Article at Svenskt biografiskt lexikon 

1841 births
1902 deaths
Swedish Army major generals
People from Malmö
Burials at Norra begravningsplatsen
Members of the Royal Swedish Academy of War Sciences
Commanders First Class of the Order of the Sword
Knights of the Order of the Polar Star